Hickory Mountain may refer to:

 Hickory Mountain (Arizona) in Arizona, USA
 Hickory Mountain (Georgia) in Georgia, USA
 Hickory Mountain (Maine) in Maine, USA
 Hickory Mountain (New Jersey) in New Jersey, USA
 Hickory Mountain (New York) in New York, USA
 Hickory Mountain (Chatham County, North Carolina) in Chatham County, North Carolina, USA
 Hickory Mountain (Jackson County, North Carolina) in Jackson County, North Carolina, USA
 Hickory Mountain (Transylvania County, North Carolina) in Transylvania County, North Carolina, USA
 Hickory Mountain (Wilkes County, North Carolina) in Wilkes County, North Carolina, USA
 Hickory Mountain (Texas) in Texas, USA